Manipuri architecture may refer to:
 Meitei architecture, the architecture of the Meitei people, in association with traditional Meitei religion (Sanamahism) 
 architecture of the Hindu temples in Manipur
 architectural designs for the buildings and structures in Manipur
 architectural designs for the monuments and memorials in Manipur